Mallex Lydell Smith (born May 6, 1993) is an American professional baseball outfielder for the Saraperos de Saltillo of the Mexican League. He has played in Major League Baseball (MLB) for the Atlanta Braves in 2016, Tampa Bay Rays from 2017 to 2018, and Seattle Mariners from 2019 to 2020.

Smith played college baseball at Santa Fe College. He was drafted in the fifth round of the 2013 MLB draft by the San Diego Padres. In the 2014 offseason, he was traded to the Atlanta Braves, where he made his MLB debut on April 11, 2016. On January 11, 2017, Smith was traded to the Seattle Mariners, who then traded him to the Tampa Bay Rays on the same day. Smith had a breakout season in 2018, making the Opening Day roster and hitting .296/.367/.406 in a career-high 141 games with a 3.5 bWAR. Following the 2018 season, he was traded back to the Seattle Mariners.

Early life
Smith was born in Tallahassee, Florida on May 6, 1993, as one of four children to Michael and Loretta Smith. He attended James S. Rickards High School, where he played American football as a safety, along with baseball.

Smith was drafted by the Milwaukee Brewers in the 13th round of the 2011 Major League Baseball Draft out of high school. He did not sign with the Brewers, instead playing college baseball at Santa Fe College. In his only collegiate baseball season, Smith hit for a .380 batting average, 17 extra-base hits, 17 runs batted in, and 31 stolen bases.

Professional career

San Diego Padres
Smith was drafted by the San Diego Padres in the fifth round of the 2012 Draft. He signed with the Padres for a $375,000 signing bonus and made his professional debut that season with the Arizona League Padres. He also played for the Eugene Emeralds that year, hitting .305 with two home runs and 17 stolen bases between the two teams.

Smith opened the 2013 season with the Fort Wayne TinCaps. He played in 110 games, hitting .262/.367/.340 with four home runs and 64 stolen bases. The stolen bases were one short of the TinCaps record. Smith started 2014 back with Fort Wayne. During the season, he was promoted to the Lake Elsinore Storm. He finished the year hitting .310 with five home runs and led all minor league players in stolen bases with 88.

Atlanta Braves

On December 19, 2014, the Padres traded Smith, Dustin Peterson, Max Fried, and Jace Peterson to the Atlanta Braves in exchange for Justin Upton and Aaron Northcraft. Smith was invited to attend spring training with the Braves, despite not having any Double A experience at the time. He began the 2015 season with the Mississippi Braves, appearing in 57 games, hitting for a .340 batting average and a .418 on-base percentage, before being promoted to the Gwinnett Braves of the Class AAA International League in June. Smith finished the season at Class AAA, hitting .306, with a .706 on base plus slugging percentage for the year. He was named the Braves' Minor League Player of the Year for all levels and added to 40-man roster after the season.

Smith started the 2016 season with Gwinnett. The Braves promoted Smith to the major leagues on April 11, 2016. He debuted that night against the Washington Nationals, starting in center field. Smith went 1-for-3 in his first game, with a strikeout and a single against Max Scherzer. Smith's helmet lacerated his forehead on a stolen base attempt in the fourth inning, and he left the game. Two days later, Smith recorded his first stolen base against the same team. His first career RBI on April 17 helped the Braves sweep the Miami Marlins. Smith hit his first career home run off New York Mets pitcher Matt Harvey on May 3. On June 20, Smith fractured his thumb after Mets pitcher Antonio Bastardo hit him with a fastball. The next day, Smith was placed on the disabled list and expected to miss eight to ten weeks of the season. After a July reevaluation, his return date was moved to September. Braves interim manager Brian Snitker later stated Smith would likely miss the remainder of the season. However, Smith returned on September 17, with two weeks left in the regular season, to serve as a bench player. Smith spent the 2016 offseason with the Naranjeros de Hermosillo of the Liga Mexicana del Pacífico and was released in October. He then joined the Indios de Mayagüez of Liga de Béisbol Profesional Roberto Clemente. Smith strained his oblique while playing in Puerto Rico and left the team in December.

Tampa Bay Rays

2017 
On January 11, 2017, the Braves traded Smith, along with Shae Simmons, to the Seattle Mariners in exchange for minor-league pitchers Luiz Gohara and Thomas Burrows. That same day, the Mariners traded Smith, Ryan Yarbrough, and Carlos Vargas to the Tampa Bay Rays for Drew Smyly.

With the Braves, Smith had worn uniform number 17, but switched to 0 upon joining the Rays because his preferred number 13 was unavailable. A longtime fan of Friday the 13th, Smith said after his trade to the Rays that the franchise's main character Jason Voorhees represents his effort to be opposing teams' "worst nightmare." Smith has stated of his switch to zero, "My name's kinda different, my game is a little bit different, you know what, I'm gonna go with zero." On April 9, after reaching base five times (a single, double and three walks), stealing two bases, and scoring the walk-off run in a 3-2 victory against the Toronto Blue Jays, Chris Archer coined the term "Mallex Effect" to describe Smith's ability to wreak havoc and change games with his scrappy and speedy play. On August 18, Smith was optioned down to Triple-A Durham to make room for Kevin Kiermaier, who was returning off the disabled list. At the time of his demotion, Smith was hitting .279 with 16 stolen bases through 67 games. Mallex was later recalled, and finished the season hitting .270 with 16 stolen bases in 81 games.

2018 
Smith made the opening day roster in 2018 with the plan to platoon with Denard Span in left field. In the 2018 season, Smith began wearing a large Florida shaped gold chain in order to represent his Florida roots. After an injury to Kevin Kiermaier he became the starting center fielder. Due to his play and the trade of Denard Span, Smith began playing every day upon Kiermaier's return. By the 2018 All-Star break, Smith set a career high in games played at 86. On August 26, Smith was placed on the 10-day disabled list with a viral infection. At this time, Smith was seventh in the American League with a .307 batting average and fourth with 27 steals. Smith was announced as a nominee for the Roberto Clemente Award, which is the recognition of a player who best represents the game of baseball through extraordinary character, community involvement, philanthropy and positive contributions on and off the field. Smith was also named the winner of the Paul C. Smith Champion Award, given to the Rays player who best exemplifies the spirit of true professionalism on and off the field. Smith ended his breakout season setting career highs, he slashed .296/.367/.406 in 544 plate appearances over 141 games (which led the team), recording 40 stolen bases (second in the American League), 10 triples (tied for most in the American League), 65 runs, and 40 runs batted in. Smith also ended the season recording a 3.5 WAR, the second highest position player WAR on the team (behind Joey Wendle).

Seattle Mariners

2019 
On November 8, 2018, the Rays traded Smith back to the Mariners along with minor-leaguer Jake Fraley in exchange for Mike Zunino, Guillermo Heredia, and Michael Plassmeyer. During Spring Training, Smith injured the flexor bundle in his right arm when overdoing his throwing routine, sidelining him for the 2019 Opening Series in Tokyo, Japan. However, Smith returned in time for the Mariners home opener on March 28, going 1 for 5 in his Mariners debut. On April 30, Smith was optioned to Triple-A Tacoma after hitting just .165/.255/.247 and struggling defensively within the first month of the season. After hitting .333 with three doubles and a home run in 10 games in Tacoma, Smith was called back up on May 16.

In 2019 he batted .227/.300/.335, had the highest Soft Contact Percentage of all major league batters (25.0%), and led the major leagues with 46 stolen bases.

2020
Smith was outrighted from the Mariners 40-man roster on September 11, 2020. At the time of his removal from the roster, he had hit .133/.170/.178 over 47 plate appearances for the Mariners in 2020. Smith elected free agency on September 28, 2020.

New York Mets
On November 4, 2020, Smith signed a minor league deal with the New York Mets. Smith did not appear in a game for the Mets organization before being released on May 28, 2021.

Cincinnati Reds
On June 18, 2021, Smith signed a minor league contract with the Cincinnati Reds organization. In 22 games with the Triple-A Louisville Bats, Smith hit .231 with 1 home run and 5 RBI's.

Toronto Blue Jays
On August 14, 2021, Smith was traded to the Toronto Blue Jays. He was assigned to the Triple-A Buffalo Bisons. On November 29, Smith signed a minor league contract with the Blue Jays and was invited to spring training. He was released on June 2, 2022.

Kansas City Monarchs
On June 12, 2022, Smith signed with the Kansas City Monarchs of the American Association of Professional Baseball. He appeared in 27 games slashing .281/.374/.368 with 2 home runs and 6 RBIs. He was released on October 4, 2022.

Saraperos de Saltillo
On January 31, 2023, Smith re-signed with the Monarchs for the 2023 season. However, on February 8, Smith signed with the Saraperos de Saltillo of the Mexican League.

References

External links

1993 births
Living people
African-American baseball players
American League stolen base champions
Baseball players from Tallahassee, Florida
Major League Baseball center fielders
Atlanta Braves players
Tampa Bay Rays players
Seattle Mariners players
Arizona League Padres players
Eugene Emeralds players
Fort Wayne TinCaps players
Lake Elsinore Storm players
Mississippi Braves players
Gwinnett Braves players
Durham Bulls players
Charlotte Stone Crabs players
Tacoma Rainiers players
Buffalo Bisons (minor league) players
21st-century African-American sportspeople
Florida Complex League Blue Jays players
Junior college baseball players in the United States
Toros del Este players
American expatriate baseball players in Mexico
Naranjeros de Hermosillo players
Kansas City Monarchs (American Association) players
American expatriate baseball players in the Dominican Republic
Indios de Mayagüez players